Pseudocrossocheilus tridentis is a species of cyprinid fish that is endemic to China.

References

Fish described in 1986
Pseudocrossocheilus